Ludovico Furconio was a Roman Catholic prelate who served as Bishop of Giovinazzo (1528–1549).

Biography
On 4 December 1528, Ludovico Furconio was appointed by Pope Clement VII as Bishop of Giovinazzo. He served as Bishop of Giovinazzo until his resignation in 1549.

References

External links and additional sources
 (for Chronology of Bishops) 
 (for Chronology of Bishops) 

16th-century Italian Roman Catholic bishops
Bishops appointed by Pope Clement VII